Parmotrema asperum is a species of saxicolous lichen in the family Parmeliaceae. Found in Brazil, it was described as new to science in 2008. The lichen is named for the coarse appearance of the thallus.

See also
List of Parmotrema species

References

asperum
Lichen species
Lichens described in 2008
Lichens of Brazil
Taxa named by John Alan Elix